Dorian Aldegheri (born 4 August 1993) is a French rugby union player, currently playing in the prop for Top 14 side Toulouse.

International career
Aldegheri won his first cap for France as a replacement in the side's loss to England in the 2019 Six Nations.

References

External links
 France profile at FFR
 Toulouse profile
 

1993 births
Living people
French rugby union players
French sportspeople of Italian descent
Stade Toulousain players
Rugby union props
France international rugby union players
Rugby union players from Toulouse